Osmo is a line of hands-on educational digital/physical games produced by the company Tangible Play, based in Palo Alto, California. Osmo's products are built around its proprietary “Reflective Artificial Intelligence,” a system that uses a stand and a clip-on mirror to allow an iPad or iPhone's front-facing camera to recognize and track objects in the physical play space in front of the device.

Time magazine named Osmo one of the 25 Best Inventions of 2014 and in 2017, Fast Company named Osmo one of the top ten “most innovative companies” in education. Osmo games are available for sale online and in retail outlets such as Target and the Apple Store. Osmo was acquired by Byju's in January 2019 for $120 million.

Development 
Osmo was developed by Tangible Play, a company founded in 2013 by Pramod Sharma and Jérôme Scholler,  ”two Stanford alums and ex-Googlers with kids.” They were inspired by observing Sharma's daughter, then five years old, interact with an iPad. "She had her face glued to screen, which seems unhealthy and not natural," according to Sharma. The partners created a game system that uses a mirror over the camera to turn the screen into “an interactive partner in physical games”

Products

Words 
Words is a game where players examine on-screen picture clues and then spell out words with tangible letter tiles.  According to Common Sense Education, “The range of difficulty means every student can be challenged, and the variety of word packs — and the option to add your own — makes it really versatile for fun and learning.”

Tangram 
In a modern version of the classic educational game, children arrange tangible tangram pieces to match shapes they see on the screen. Tangrams are good for developing spatial awareness skills.

Newton 
Newton is a physics-based game where players direct small bouncing balls into targeted areas by drawing platforms and ramps, or even by placing physical objects in the playing space. According to The Toy Insider, “It’s kind of like a high-tech version of pinball — super fun!”

Numbers 
Numbers is an ocean-themed math game, where players try to pop bubbles and free fish by getting an effective combination of number tiles on the table. GeekDad said, “Seeing it in action feels almost magical–you throw a bunch of tiles out there, and the app uses the camera to read them instantly, displaying them on the screen and adding them up (or multiplying, as the case may be).”

Masterpiece 
Masterpiece uses computer vision to analyze any image and translate it into a traceable image. According to VentureBeat, “It’s an app that enables kids and adults to become digital artists and regain confidence in their ability to draw.”

Coding Awbie 
Players learn about coding by placing magnetically linking coding blocks in sequences to control a character (Awbie) on an adventure. New Atlas called Coding Awbie “a good way of introducing younger children to the concepts of logic and problem solving.”

Monster 
Mo, the monster, takes kids real-life drawings and incorporates them into his animated world. “The whole thing is then automatically saved as a video clip, which you can share with grandma,” reported Wired magazine. In 2017, Osmo introduced a Spanish-language version of Monster, voiced by actor Jaime Camil.

Pizza Co. 
Pizza Co. combines cooking and entrepreneur play with interactive tokens representing ingredients and money. Pizza Co. won a Gold Award from Parents’ Choice, who said the game “immerses children in basic mathematics skills blended with hours of imaginative and cooperative play.”

Coding Jam 
Coding Jam teaches coding concepts through the creative act of making music. “An open-ended music studio with dozens of characters and instruments, Coding Jam is intuitive enough for a 5 year old but offers enough complexity for a 10 year old to master and mix intricate compositions,” according to Venturebeat.

Hot Wheels™ MindRacers 
Osmo partnered with Mattel to create MindRacers, a game combining real Hot Wheels™ cars with virtual on-screen racetracks. MindRacers is the first Hot Wheels™ product that says it is for both “boys and girls” on the box.

This is the only Osmo game to be compatible with the IPad only (due to the way the play field is shaped).

References

External links
 

Educational games
Companies based in Palo Alto, California
Companies established in 2013
Byju's